Waverton Investment Management is an investment management firm headquartered in Westminster, London, United Kingdom.

History
The firm was established as J. O. Hambro Investment Management in 1986. It was co-founded by Richard Hambro, Lord Balniel, and David Chaplin. It was named in honor of Richard Hambro's father, Jocelyn Olaf Hambro. It is a completely separate company from J.O. Hambro Capital Management.

The firm was acquired by Credit Suisse in 2001, who sold it to Somers Limited in 2013. It was renamed Waverton Investment Management in 2014. 

In 2019, the firm acquired London-based independent financial planning and investment advisory business Timothy James & Partners. 

The firm had GBP £12.7 billion of assets under management as at 31 March 2022.

References

Privately held companies based in London
Financial services companies established in 1986
Hambro family